Mario Villamizar (born March 3, 1995) is a professional Canadian football fullback for the Toronto Argonauts of the Canadian Football League (CFL).

University career
After using a redshirt season in 2014, Villamizar played U Sports football for the Wilfrid Laurier Golden Hawks from 2015 to 2018. He was part of the 2016 Yates Cup championship team and played in 31 regular season games and seven playoff games over four seasons. In his career, he had 16 receptions for 191 yards and five touchdowns and was named an OUA second-team all-star in 2018.

Professional career
Villamizar was drafted 51st overall, in the sixth round, by the BC Lions in the 2019 CFL Draft and signed with the team on May 16, 2019. He made the team's active roster following 2019 training camp and played in his first professional game on June 15, 2019, against the Winnipeg Blue Bombers. He made his first career reception late in the season on October 5, 2022, against the Toronto Argonauts, and finished the year having played in all 18 regular season games with two catches for 13 yards.

Villamizar did not play in 2020 due to the cancellation of the 2020 CFL season. During off-season workouts in preparation for the 2021 season, he suffered an Achilles injury and began the year on the retired list. He re-signed with the team on October 8, 2021, and played in the team's final five games of the season.

On December 14, 2021, it was announced that Villamizar had signed a contract extension with the Lions. He again made the team's active roster following training camp in 2022. He played in 17 regular season games where he had one kickoff return for seven yards. Villamizar became a free agent upon the expiry of his contract on February 14, 2023.

Toronto Argonauts
On the first day of free agency, on February 14, 2023, it was announced that Villamizar had signed with the Toronto Argonauts.

References

External links
 Toronto Argonauts bio

1995 births
Living people
BC Lions players
Canadian football fullbacks
Wilfrid Laurier Golden Hawks football players
Players of Canadian football from Ontario
Sportspeople from St. Catharines
Toronto Argonauts players